Danièle Thompson (born 3 January 1942) is a Monegasque film director and screenwriter. Thompson is the daughter of film director Gérard Oury, and actress Jacqueline Roman.

She has written screenplays for a number of highly successful films including  Cousin, cousine, La Boum, Belphégor - Le fantôme du Louvre, La Reine Margot and Jet Lag, which she also directed. She was nominated for the 1976 Academy Award for Writing Original Screenplay for Cousin, cousine. Her 2006 film, Fauteuils d'orchestre was France's entrant for the Academy Award for Best Foreign Film. She is half Jewish from her father, and was on the 1986 Cannes Film Festival jury.

In 2009, Thompson signed a petition in support of film director Roman Polanski, calling for his release after Polanski was arrested in Switzerland in relation to his 1977 sexual abuse case

In 2010, she joined Isabelle Adjani, Paul Auster, Isabelle Huppert, Milan Kundera, Salman Rushdie, Mathilde Seigner, Jean-Pierre Thiollet and Henri Tisot in signing the petition in support of Roman Polanski when the film director was temporarily arrested by Swiss police at the request of U.S authorities.

Thompson's son is the actor Christopher Thompson. They have written screenplays together, most notably those of Jet Lag and Season's Beatings.

Filmography

References

External links

1942 births
Living people
French film directors
Monegasque writers
Monegasque women writers
French women screenwriters
French screenwriters